Sigríður Beinteinsdóttir, better known as Sigga, is an Icelandic singer who competed for her native country in the Eurovision Song Contest three times. She was born on 24 July 1962 in Reykjavík.

She got three 12-point votes overall, two from the United Kingdom and one from Portugal. With Stjórnin, she achieved  Iceland's best result of fourth place until 1999, when Selma Björnsdóttir came second.

References

1962 births
Living people
Eurovision Song Contest entrants of 1990
Eurovision Song Contest entrants of 1992
Eurovision Song Contest entrants of 1994
Eurovision Song Contest entrants for Iceland
20th-century Icelandic women singers